Jeanmal Prosper (born 25 May 1993) is a footballer who plays as a right-back for Risborough Rangers. Born in England, he plays for the Dominica national team.

Club career
Prosper is a journeyman footballer who spent his entire career below the National League with various semi-pro and professional sides in England. He began his senior career with Aylesbury F.C. in 2010. He followed that up with stints at Arlesey Town, Chesham United, Hale Leys United, Thame Rangers, and Winslow United before returning to Chesham United in January 2018. He had a stint with Hemel Hempstead Town in the National League in 2022. His last appearance was with Risborough Rangers in January 2022.

International career
Born in England, Prosper is of Dominica descent. He debuted with the senior Dominica national team in a 0–0 2022–23 CONCACAF Nations League tie with Anguilla on 1 June 2022.

Playing style
Prosper is a utility footballer; usually a right-back, he is also able to slot in at centre-back and midfielder.

References

External links
 
 Aylesbury United Profile

1993 births
Living people
People with acquired Dominica citizenship
Dominica footballers
Dominica international footballers
English footballers
English people of Dominica descent
Association football fullbacks
Aylesbury F.C. players
Aylesbury United F.C. players
Arlesey Town F.C. players
Chesham United F.C. players
Hemel Hempstead Town F.C. players
National League (English football) players